The Škoda 76.5 mm L/50 was a Czech anti-aircraft gun used during the Second World War.  Those weapons captured after the German occupation of Czechoslovakia in March 1939 were taken into Wehrmacht service as the 7.65 cm Flak 33(t).

History
The 76.5 mm L/50 was produced by the Škoda works in Pilsen.  It was designed to replace an assortment of earlier Austro-Hungarian anti-aircraft guns that were in Czech use.  Photos of the gun indicate that it had a box trail, a single unsprung axle, two spoked wheels, two recoil cylinders beneath the barrel and a muzzle brake. There is some confusion about the exact title of the gun, when it was produced or how many were produced.  What can be agreed on is there was a Škoda 76.5 mm anti-aircraft gun produced sometime between 1928–1933, it was 50 calibers in length and it was used by the armed forces of Argentina, Czechoslovakia, Lithuania, Nazi Germany, Romania and Yugoslavia.

Notes

References
 Gander, Terry and Chamberlain, Peter. Anti-Aircraft Guns. New York: Doubleday, 1979

External links
 Air Defense Artillery - Militariarg.com

Anti-aircraft guns of Czechoslovakia
World War II anti-aircraft guns
76 mm artillery